A depth buffer, also known as a z-buffer, is a type of data buffer used in computer graphics to represent depth information of objects in 3D space from a particular perspective. Depth buffers are an aid to rendering a scene to ensure that the correct polygons properly occlude other polygons. Z-buffering was first described in 1974 by Wolfgang Straßer in his PhD thesis on fast algorithms for rendering occluded objects. A similar solution to determining overlapping polygons is the painter's algorithm, which is capable of handling non-opaque scene elements, though at the cost of efficiency and incorrect results.

In a 3D-rendering pipeline, when an object is projected on the screen, the depth (z-value) of a generated fragment in the projected screen image is compared to the value already stored in the buffer (depth test), and replaces it if the new value is closer. It works in tandem with the rasterizer, which computes the colored values. The fragment output by the rasterizer is saved if it is not overlapped by another fragment.

When viewing an image containing partially or fully overlapping opaque objects or surfaces, it is not possible to fully see those objects that are farthest away from the viewer and behind other objects (i.e., some surfaces are hidden behind others). If there were no mechanism for managing overlapping surfaces, surfaces would render on top of each other, not caring if they are meant to be behind other objects. The identification and removal of these surfaces are called the hidden-surface problem. To check for overlap, the computer calculates the z-value of a pixel corresponding to the first object and compares it with the z-value at the same pixel location in the z-buffer. If the calculated z-value is smaller than the z-value already in the z-buffer (i.e., the new pixel is closer), then the current z-value in the z-buffer is replaced with the calculated value. This is repeated for all objects and surfaces in the scene (often in parallel). In the end, the z-buffer will allow correct reproduction of the usual depth perception: a close object hides one further away. This is called z-culling.

The z-buffer has the same internal data structure as an image, namely a 2D-array, with the only difference being that it stores a single value for each screen pixel instead of color images that use 3 values to create color. This makes the z-buffer appear black-and-white because it is not storing color information. The buffer has the same dimensions as the screen buffer for consistency.

Primary visibility tests (such as back-face culling) and secondary visibility tests (such as overlap checks and screen clipping) are usually performed on objects' polygons in order to skip specific polygons that are unnecessary to render. Z-buffer, by comparison, is comparatively expensive, so performing primary and secondary visibility tests relieve the z-buffer of some duty.

The granularity of a z-buffer has a great influence on the scene quality: the traditional 16-bit z-buffer can result in artifacts (called "z-fighting" or stitching) when two objects are very close to each other. A more modern 24-bit or 32-bit z-buffer behaves much better, although the problem cannot be eliminated without additional algorithms. An 8-bit z-buffer is almost never used since it has too little precision.

Uses

The Z-buffer is a technology used in almost all contemporary computers, laptops, and mobile phones for performing 3D computer graphics. The primary use now is for video games, which require fast and accurate processing of 3D scenes. The Z-buffer is implemented in hardware within consumer graphics cards. The Z-buffer is also used (implemented as software as opposed to hardware) for producing computer-generated special effects for films.

Furthermore, Z-buffer data obtained from rendering a surface from a light's point-of-view permits the creation of shadows by the shadow mapping technique.

Developments

Even with small enough granularity, quality problems may arise when precision in the z-buffer's distance values are not spread evenly over distance. Nearer values are much more precise (and hence can display closer objects better) than values that are farther away. Generally, this is desirable, but sometimes it will cause artifacts to appear as objects become more distant. A variation on z-buffering which results in more evenly distributed precision is called w-buffering (see below).

At the start of a new scene, the z-buffer must be cleared to a defined value, usually 1.0, because this value is the upper limit (on a scale of 0 to 1) of depth, meaning that no object is present at this point through the viewing frustum.

The invention of the z-buffer concept is most often attributed to Edwin Catmull, although Wolfgang Straßer described this idea in his 1974 Ph.D. thesis months before Catmull's invention.

On more recent PC graphics cards (1999–2005), z-buffer management uses a significant chunk of the available memory bandwidth. Various methods have been employed to reduce the performance cost of z-buffering, such as lossless compression (computer resources to compress/decompress are cheaper than bandwidth) and ultra-fast hardware z-clear that makes obsolete the "one frame positive, one frame negative" trick (skipping inter-frame clear altogether using signed numbers to cleverly check depths).

Z-culling

In rendering, z-culling is early pixel elimination based on depth, a method that provides an increase in performance when rendering of hidden surfaces is costly. It is a direct consequence of z-buffering, where the depth of each pixel candidate is compared to the depth of the existing geometry behind which it might be hidden.

When using a z-buffer, a pixel can be culled (discarded) as soon as its depth is known, which makes it possible to skip the entire process of lighting and texturing a pixel that would not be visible anyway. Also, time-consuming pixel shaders will generally not be executed for the culled pixels. This makes z-culling a good optimization candidate in situations where fillrate, lighting, texturing, or pixel shaders are the main bottlenecks.

While z-buffering allows the geometry to be unsorted, sorting polygons by increasing depth (thus using a reverse painter's algorithm) allows each screen pixel to be rendered fewer times. This can increase performance in fillrate-limited scenes with large amounts of overdraw, but if not combined with z-buffering it suffers from severe problems such as:
 polygons might occlude one another in a cycle (e.g.: triangle A occludes B, B occludes C, C occludes A), and
 there is no canonical "closest" point on a triangle (e.g.: no matter whether one sorts triangles by their centroid or closest point or furthest point, one can always find two triangles A and B such that A is "closer" but in reality B should be drawn first).
As such, a reverse painter's algorithm cannot be used as an alternative to Z-culling (without strenuous re-engineering), except as an optimization to Z-culling. For example, an optimization might be to keep polygons sorted according to x/y-location and z-depth to provide bounds, in an effort to quickly determine if two polygons might possibly have an occlusion interaction.

Mathematics

 

Values outside of this range correspond to points which are not in the viewing frustum, and shouldn't be rendered.

Fixed-point representation

Typically, these values are stored in the z-buffer of the hardware graphics accelerator in fixed point format.

Simplifying:

Second, the above formula is multiplied by  where d is the depth of the z-buffer (usually 16, 24 or 32 bits) and rounding the result to an integer:

This formula can be inverted and derived in order to calculate the z-buffer resolution (the 'granularity' mentioned earlier). The inverse of the above :

where 

The z-buffer resolution in terms of camera space would be the incremental value resulted from the smallest change in the integer stored in the z-buffer, which is +1 or -1.

Expressing it back in camera space terms, by substituting  by the above :

The smaller  is, the less precision there is far away—having the  plane set too closely is a common cause of undesirable rendering artifacts in more distant objects.

W-buffer

However, these values cannot be linearly interpolated across screen space from the vertices—they usually have to be inverted, interpolated, and then inverted again. There are implementations of the w-buffer that avoid the inversions altogether.

Whether a z-buffer or w-buffer results in a better image depends on the application.

Algorithmics
The following pseudocode demonstrates the process of z-buffering:
// First of all, initialize the depth of each pixel.
d(i, j) = infinite // Max length

// Initialize the color value for each pixel to the background color
c(i, j) = background color

// For each polygon, do the following steps :
for (each pixel in polygon's projection)
{
    // Find depth i.e, z of polygon
    //   at (x, y) corresponding to pixel (i, j)   
    if (z < d(i, j))
    {
        d(i, j) = z;
        c(i, j) = color;
    }
}

See also
 Z-fighting
 Irregular Z-buffer
 Z-order
 A-buffer
 Depth map
 HyperZ
 Stencil buffer

References

External links
 Learning to Love your Z-buffer
 Alpha-blending and the Z-buffer

Notes

3D rendering